Frank Mather may refer to:

 Frank Jewett Mather (1868–1953), American art critic and professor
 Frank Mather (footballer), English football goalkeeper